Joseph C. Drum (May 1, 1874 – March 14, 1926) was an American football player and coach. He served as the first head football coach at Boston College. He, along with future Congressman Joseph F. O'Connell, were the founders of BC football team in 1892. When the team began play in 1893, Drum was named the team's head coach, then an unpaid position. Drum was also the team's first quarterback. On October 26, 1893, he scored BC's first ever touchdown on a fumble recovery. It was the only score in BC's 4–0 victory over Saint John's Literary Institute. He died of pneumonia in 1926.

Head coaching record

References

1874 births
1926 deaths
Deaths from pneumonia in New York City
American football quarterbacks
Boston College Eagles football coaches
Boston College Eagles football players
People from Menard County, Texas